Dorothy Miranda Clark, known mononymously as Dodie (stylised dodie), is an English singer, songwriter, author and YouTuber. Dodie began her career uploading original songs and covers to YouTube. She has over 210 videos, over 2 million subscribers and over 415 million views on her main channel (as of October 2022). On her side channel, she has over 190 videos, over 910k subscribers and over 98 million views.

Dodie has released four independent EPs: Intertwined (2016), You (2017), Human (2019), and Hot Mess (2022), the first three of which charted in the top 40 of the official UK Albums Chart. Her debut studio album, Build a Problem, was released in 2021 and peaked at number 3 on the UK Albums Chart.

Early life and education
Dodie was born Dorothy Miranda Clark. She has a brother named Ian (spelling unknown). She attended the Leventhorpe School.

Career

2007–2016: YouTube beginnings and Intertwined
Dodie's first channel was called "Dodders5", now known as the "Alice and Dodie show!", which was created on 1 August 2007 and shared with her friend Alice Webb.

Dodie's main channel "doddleoddle" was created on 7 February 2011; her first video on that channel, an original song called "Rain", was uploaded on 14 April that year. In addition to her main channel, she has a VEVO channel, "dodieVEVO", created on 5 December 2016, and a side channel, "doddlevloggle", created on 28 January 2012.

On 18 November 2016, she self-released her first EP, Intertwined. Despite its unsigned status, the EP reached number 35 on the official UK album charts during its first week of release.

On 9 December 2016, she released the first video on Vevo channel, dodieVEVO, which has over 75 million views. Dodie has collaborated with many other musicians, including Tessa Violet, Julia Nunes, Lauren Aquilina, Orla Gartland, Thomas Sanders, Jacob Collier, Emma Blackery, Pomplamoose and Flashback. In 2018, she collaborated with singer Tom Walker on "Human", the lead single from her third EP, also titled Human.

Dodie also co-hosted Coca-Cola's CokeTV alongside fellow YouTuber Manny Brown, where she took part in various activities.

2017–2019: You, Secrets For the Mad and Human

Dodie's second EP, You, was released on 11 August 2017. In its opening week of release, the EP debuted at number 6 on the official UK Albums Chart—29 places higher than the peak of Intertwined, a new personal best.  It also debuted at number 55 on the US Billboard 200.

In June 2017, Dodie announced that she was writing a book, and the autobiographical Secrets for the Mad: Obsessions, Confessions and Life Lessons was published on 2 November 2017.

In 2018, she was featured in a collaboration with Faultline, a cover of the song "All I Do Is Dream of You" which was featured in an advertising campaign by Audi in the United Kingdom.

On 18 September 2018, Dodie announced her third EP, entitled Human, which came out on 18 January 2019, the title track being the lead single released on 21 September. The EP rose to number 5 on the official UK Albums Chart.

2019–present: Build a Problem and Hot Mess

In 2019, she was a part of the Moominvalley soundtrack with a song titled Ready Now. Later that year she released a single called Guiltless, as well as a collaboration with Jacob Collier, with a cover of Here Comes the Sun. Following the release of her collaboration with Jacob Collier, she announced the release of a new single "Boys Like You" on 6 September. It was released on 27 September.

On 19 October 2020, Dodie announced she would be releasing her first full-length studio album Build a Problem on 5 March 2021. The first single, "Cool Girl" was premiered on BBC Radio and released on multiple streaming platforms. On 8 February 2021, it was announced that the album was to be delayed until 26 March 2021 due to complications from the COVID-19 pandemic and Brexit. She later made an announcement on 11 March that it would be further delayed until 7 May 2021. The album received positive reviews from critics upon release, and debuted at number three on the UK Albums Chart, her charting highest position to date.

On 29 July 2022, Dodie released "Got Weird", her first solo single since Build a Problem. On 2 September 2022, she released the follow-up single "Hot Mess", and announced an EP of the same name, which was released on 30 September 2022.

Common musical themes

Romance/relationships 
One of Dodie's most prominent themes is romance. Her most popular EP, You, is about love, as is Would You Be So Kind; however, in the official YouTube video she says that the latter song no longer holds its original meaning. Other songs on the theme of romance include Intertwined, Absolutely Smitten, You, and Boys Like You. Her songs often deal with people she has fallen in love with, and sometimes the toxicity of those relationships; in You, the lyrics include the words "Oh, I have a habit of searching for the damage / To share my love".

Bisexuality 

Many of Dodie's romance songs explore bisexuality: in "She", Dodie writes about being attracted to a girl rather than a boy. In the song she explores these feelings, and asks if it is wrong to be attracted to another female: "Am I allowed to look at her like that / Could it be wrong when she's just so nice to look at?

In "Rainbow", she specifically sings about the struggles of those who, like herself, identify as LGBTQ+. Here Dodie specifically redefines her sexuality, as compared with her 2017 video I'm Bisexual—A Coming Out Song. In an interview, she says, "I think when I was younger I was so excited too because firstly it like it felt like a very exciting thing. I wanted to rush out and say it." In the same interview, she says that as she grew older she began to realize the difficulties of being bisexual, and the inner biphobia she faced; this led to her writing Rainbow.

Friendship 
In addition to themes of romance, Dodie often sings about friendships, specifically about growing up with friends and losing them; in her YouTube video Sick of Losing Soulmates – Explanation, Tutorial and Karaoke!, she says that the song "Sick of Losing Soulmates" describes her feelings about losing friends: "I'm done with losing my best friends like my soulmates" Another song that explores the theme of friendship is "Party Tattoos". Dodie writes on Genius Lyrics that as a child she often had strict regulations on what she could and could not do, so as a teenager she made friends with anyone who she connected with.

Self-worth 
Other Dodie songs consider self-worth and mental health; her videos cover topics such as anxiety, depression, depersonalization and derealization.  "Burned Out" from the EP Human, and "Secret for the Mad" are about mental illness and healing: "I've got a secret for the mad / In a little bit of time it wont hurt so bad". "Hate Myself", from Dodie's first full-length album Build a Problem, considers her own self hate and insecurities, and their impact on her relationships.

Personal life
In May 2016, Dodie came out as bisexual in a YouTube video. In 2017, she released a song entitled "I'm bisexual—a coming out song!".

Awards and nominations

Discography

Albums
Build a Problem (2021)

Extended plays
Intertwined (2016)
You (2017)
Human (2019)
Hot Mess (2022)

Tours

Headlining
Intertwined Tour (2017)  
You Tour (2017–2018) She also had her 3rd UK tour, titled 'The Spring Tour' 
Human Tour (2019)
Build a Problem Tour (2021-2022)

References

External links

 dodie on YouTube
 

1995 births
Bisexual actresses
British Internet celebrities
Bisexual singers
Bisexual songwriters
British women bloggers
English atheists
English feminists
English video bloggers
English women singers
English YouTubers
Feminist musicians
Living people
English LGBT songwriters
English LGBT singers
LGBT YouTubers
Music YouTubers
Musicians from Essex
Practitioners of autonomous sensory meridian response
Shorty Award winners
20th-century English women singers
20th-century LGBT people
21st-century English women singers
21st-century LGBT people